or  is a lake that lies in the municipality of Grane in Nordland county, Norway. The  lake lies just west of Børgefjell National Park.

See also
 List of lakes in Norway
 Geography of Norway

References

Lakes of Nordland
Grane, Nordland